Mercedes Núñez Monzón (born 29 July 1986) is a Paraguayan footballer who plays as a midfielder. She has been a member of the Paraguay women's national team.

International career
Núñez played for Paraguay at senior level in the 2014 Copa América Femenina.

References

1986 births
Living people
Women's association football midfielders
Paraguayan women's footballers
Paraguay women's international footballers
Cerro Porteño players